Fairbank Lake is a lake in Northern Ontario, Canada, located within the Walden region of Greater Sudbury.

Located in the Fairbanks and Trill townships, it lies off Regional Road 4 (Fairbank Lake Road), running north of Ontario Highway 17. It is 55 kilometres west of downtown Sudbury. The lake is 705.1 hectares in size with a shoreline perimeter of 28.2 kilometres and a maximum depth of 43 metres.

The lake is home to Fairbank Provincial Park, a 105-hectare recreational-class provincial park.

History
The lake was originally named Wa-Shai-Ga-Mog (Clear Lake) by the Ojibwe or Anishinaabe nation. According to the Fairbank Lake Camp Owner's Association, they had settled on the south west corner of the lake and traded at a Hudson Bay trading post near Whitefish. The discovery of virgin white pine in 1872 resulted in lumbering activities on the south shore. The lake was officially named Fairbank Lake in 1883 after John Henry Fairbank, who was an MP for Lambton East.

Islands
Fairbank lake contains 8 islands.
Chapman Island
Fairbank Island
Hiram Hixon Island
Maplegrove Island
Pine Island
Swanson Island
Traverse Island
Wittie Island

See also
List of lakes in Ontario

References

External links
 National Resources Canada

Lakes of Greater Sudbury